Terebrataliidae is a family of brachiopods belonging to the order Terebratulida.

Genera

Genera:
 Arenaciarcula Elliott, 1959
 Coptothyris Jackson, 1918
 Dallinella Thomson, 1915

References

Brachiopods